The 1990 Puerto Rico Open was a women's tennis tournament played on outdoor hard courts at the Hyatt Regency Cerromar Hotel in San Juan in Puerto Rico that was part of the Tier IV category of the 1990 WTA Tour. It was the eighth edition of the tournament and was held from October 22 through October 27, 1990. Second-seeded Jennifer Capriati won the singles title and earned $27,000 first-prize money.

Finals

Singles
 Jennifer Capriati defeated  Zina Garrison-Jackson 5–7, 6–4, 6–2
 It was Capriati's 1st singles title of her career.

Doubles
 Elena Brioukhovets /  Natalia Medvedeva defeated  Amy Frazier /  Julie Richardson 6–4, 6–2

References

External links
 ITF tournament edition details
 Tournament draws

Puerto Rico Open
Puerto Rico Open (tennis)
Puerto Rico Open, 1990